Tyler Andretti is an American professional wrestler currently signed to All Elite Wrestling (AEW) under the ring name Action Andretti.

Professional wrestling career 
Andretti was trained to wrestle by MCW Pro Wrestling, debuting in November 2019. Over the following year, he primarily appeared with MCW Pro Wrestling in Maryland and Virginia. In June 2021, Andretti debuted with Game Changer Wrestling, competing in a scramble match on its "Zombie Walk" pay-per-view. Over the rest of 2021, he appeared with MCW Pro Wrestling, Game Changer Wrestling, and other promotions in the northeastern United States including National Championship Wrestling, Pennsylvania Premiere Wrestling, and the Susquehanna Wrestling Organization. In November 2021, he won the Shane Shamrock Memorial Cup promoted by MCW Pro Wrestling. Beginning in January 2022, Andretti began appearing regularly with Combat Zone Wrestling. In October 2022, he defeated Brian Johnson to win the MCW Heavyweight Championship. In December 2022, he lost the title to Ken Dixon in a four way match.

Andretti made his first appearance with All Elite Wrestling (AEW) in January 2022, losing to Dante Martin on an episode of AEW Dark: Elevation. He made further appearances with AEW in January and October of that year. In December 2022, he made his AEW television debut at Dynamite: Winter Is Coming, defeating Chris Jericho in an upset that drew comparisons to the May 17, 1993 bout between Razor Ramon and The Kid. Shortly thereafter, AEW president Tony Khan announced that Andretti had signed a full-time contract with the company. Andretti went on to feud with the Jericho Appreciation Society. In February 2023, he participated in the fourth annual Chris Jericho's Rock 'N' Wrestling Rager at Sea, wrestling abroad the Norwegian Pearl.

Professional wrestling style and persona 
Andretti wrestles in a "high flying" style. His finishing move is the shooting star press. He is nicknamed "the Sight to See".

Championships and accomplishments 
MCW Pro Wrestling
MCW Heavyweight Championship (1 time)
Shane Shamrock Memorial Cup (2021)

References

External links 
 
 
 

21st-century professional wrestlers
All Elite Wrestling personnel
American male professional wrestlers
Living people
People from Philadelphia
Professional wrestlers from Pennsylvania